Cambarus williami, the Brawleys Fork crayfish, is a species of crayfish in the family Cambaridae. It is endemic to Tennessee.

The IUCN conservation status of Cambarus williami is "NT", near threatened. The species may be considered threatened in the near future. The IUCN status was reviewed in 2010.

References

Further reading

 
 
 

Cambaridae
Articles created by Qbugbot
Crustaceans described in 1995
Freshwater crustaceans of North America
Endemic fauna of Tennessee